Jelek may refer to:
Yelek, female vest
Jelek (son of Árpád)
jelek, "ugly" in Indonesian
Jelek, Iraq, a village in Iraq